Elachiptera cornuta is a species of fly in the family Chloropidae, the grass flies. It is found in the  Palearctic . The larva feeds on Poaceae.It is a pest of maize and wheat.

References

Oscinellinae
Insects described in 1820